= Sinister Visions =

2013 American horror anthology film

- Directed by: Henric Brandt; Doug Gehl; Andreas Rylander; Kim Sønderholm
- Written by: Henric Brandt; Andreas Rylander; Lars Egholm Fischmann; Stefan Bommelin; Rasmus Tirzitis; Garry Charles; Cody Cather; Doug Gehl
- Produced by: Henric Brandt; Jan T. Jensen; Jim Pedersen; Andreas Rylander; Aaron Newl Trout
- Starring: Kat Herlo; Toke Lars Bjarke; David C. Hayes; Kim Sønderholm; Stefan Jonason
- Music by: Rusty Apper; Samir El Alaoui
- Production companies: Apotheosis Film; Branbomm
- Release date: 13 August 2013
- Running time: 85 minutes
- Country: United States
- Language: English

Sinister Visions is a 2013 American horror anthology film directed by Henric Brandt, Doug Gehl, Andreas Rylander and Kim Sønderholm, starring Sønderholm, Kat Herlo, Toke Lars Bjarke, David C. Hayes and Stefan Jonason.

== Cast ==
- Kat Herlo as Emma
- Toke Lars Bjarke as Tommy
- David C. Hayes as Charles
- Kim Sønderholm as Martin/Carl/Richard
- Stefan Jonason as Keith

== Reception ==
The film received a rating of 3.5 out of 5 in Horror Society. The film received a mixed review in HorrorNews.net.

Jeremy Blitz of DVD Talk wrote a negative review of the film, writing that "Everything about Sinister Visions is haphazard. Some segments have top notch acting, effects, and story. Others (like Succubus) have super cheesy (though still fun) effects, and little story to speak of. Still others, like Genital Genocide, have great effects that work to no comprehensible end."
